Auris is a commune in the Isère department in the Auvergne-Rhône-Alpes region of south-eastern France.

The inhabitants of the commune are known as Aurienchons or Aurienchonnes.

Geography

Auris is an alpine commune some 30 km south-east of Grenoble and 5 km west of Mont-de-Lans. Access to the commune is by the D211A road from La Garde in the west which passes through the commune by a tortuous route and continues east to Le Freney-d'Oisans. The D211E branches off the D211A in the commune to go to La Grand Combe. Apart from the village (which is solely the town hall) there is the hamlet of Les Cours to the north and Le Cert and Les Chatains to the south. The commune is rugged with alpine terrain and a large forest to the west of the village (La Forêt).

The Romanche river forms the southern border of the commune as it flows west to the Barrage du Clapier - an artificial lake on the southern border of the commune - then continues west then north to eventually join the Drac at Jarrie. The Venéon river flows from the south through the south-western extension of the commune to join the Romanche there.

Neighbouring communes and villages

Toponymy
The commune is sometimes informally called Auris-en-Oisans.

Administration

List of Successive Mayors

Demography
In 2017 the commune had 190 inhabitants.

Culture and heritage

Civil heritage
A Roman bridge
The Rural Museum

Religious heritage
The Chapel of the Angels (17th century). The Chapel contains several items that are registered as historical objects:
2 Candlesticks on the main Altar (17th century)
A Hand Bell (18th century)
The Altar and Retable (17th century)
The Chapel of Saint-Gerald (1497)

See also
Communes of the Isère department

References

External links
Auris on Géoportail, National Geographic Institute (IGN) website 
Auris en Oysans on the 1750 Cassini Map

Communes of Isère
Dauphiné